Pablo Donoso Prado (born December 3, 1984) is a professional racing driver from Santiago de Chile. He began racing at 9 years of age. He is racing in the Firestone Indy Lights Series and passed the Rookie Test for the Indy Racing League IndyCar Series on February 29, 2008 at Homestead-Miami Speedway.

Career
In 1994 he began his racing career, in karting, moved by his father, Jorge Donoso, who was also a race driver in Chile. And his son Fabrizio Donoso
Currently drives in F1 Esports
For Alpine Veloce Esports

Since that year and until 1999, he raced karting in the Chilean and Argentine championships with a total of 18 wins and 32 podiums, with two sub-championships and the 1996 title.

Development in Argentina
He moved to Argentina where he raced in the prestigious Fórmula Renault until 2002. In 2002 he became the 2nd Chilean driver to win a race in Argentina after Eliseo Salazar who won in 1978 Formula 4. That year, his results took him to the fight for the championship against the Argentine Juan Cruz Alvarez up to the final round, finally with a 2nd place overall.

Europe
Donoso then moved to Europe, racing in European Formula BMW Junior with a total of 4 wins, 2 poles, and 4 podiums. Again, he matched Salazar to be the second Chilean to win a European race since the Eliseo's 1980 win in the British Formula One Championship.

In 2003 he raced in the World Series Light by Nissan with the Chilean beer brand Cristal as his main sponsor and backed by his manager, former race driver, Cristián Mackenna. That year Donoso got one win at the EuroSpeedway Lausitz circuit with the Vergani Racing Team.

In 2004 he moved to the World Series by Nissan. In this series, he was the teammate of Enrique Bernoldi, a former F1 driver. At this level, he didn't succeed and he was forced to leave his seat in the middle of the season due to budget issues.

Early career in the United States
In 2004, he finished his contract with Mackenna and got in touch with Eliseo Salazar to redirect his career to the US. Looking for a small racing series to compete in with specified equipment and lower budgets, he joined the Star Mazda Series in 2005. He raced in the series with Andersen Walko Racing, competing against drivers like Marco Andretti, Graham Rahal, Jonathan Klein and Raphael Matos among others.

He won at Infineon Raceway from the pole position, his only victory of the season, with several podiums.

In a very criticized decision in his native Chile, he joined the USAC Silver Crown Series for the 2006 season; one of the oldest open-wheel series in the United States. He believed that this series could be a step to finally get to a world-class category like NASCAR or the IndyCar Series. That, and additional financial problems made Silver Crown an attractive option in spite of other series like the Infiniti Pro Series or the Champ Car Atlantic Series possibly being better suited to his goals.

USAC career
With new more formula style cars, Donoso joined the struggling series driving for Vance Racing owned by Johnny Vance. At the first races of 2006 he was able to show his potential but suffered from mechanical problems. The criticism in Chile was rising, meanwhile, many oval specialists congratulated him for this natural ability to handle the somewhat unusual cars.

The IndyCar team Hemelgarn Racing fielded a car for him in two rounds of the 2006 USAC Silver Crown season and Donoso delivered two 2nd places at the Iowa Speedway and Kansas Speedway.

IndyCar Series test and Indy Lights ride
With the goal of getting closer to the main series, in 2007 Donoso joined the team of the legendary A. J. Foyt, A. J. Foyt Enterprises. He raced the 2007 series with Tracy Hines as his teammate.

On Friday 29th, Donoso passed the IndyCar Series rookie test at Homestead Miami Speedway using Darren Manning's car under Johnny Rutherford's supervision. After that, Foyt said that Donoso would become his second driver for the 2008 IndyCar Series season. However, he would start the season racing in the Firestone Indy Lights Series for SWE Racing, signing with the team for four races. Donoso was not entered in the Indianapolis 500 with Foyt's team, the seat instead going to Jeff Simmons. Donoso continued in Indy Lights with Team Moore Racing beginning with the Freedom 100. At the race after the Freedom 100, Donoso won his first series pole at the Milwaukee Mile.

Donoso scored his first podium finish in Indy Lights competition in the time-shortened second Mid Ohio 100 race. He finished 3rd in a race won by James Davison. However, he parted ways with Team Moore after that race and was entered in Brian Stewart Racing's #3 car for the following race. He returned to Team Moore for the next pair of races at Infineon Raceway and captured his first series win in the weekend's second race as he started from the pole due to the field inversion from race 1.

Donoso signed to race in the Indy Lights in 2009 with Brian Stewart Racing. However, after the Kansas Speedway race he switched to Genoa Racing for the Freedom 100 and then Team PBIR for the Milwaukee race. He drove for his third team in as many races when he competed for RLR-Andersen Racing at Iowa Speedway and continued with RLR-Andersen on a part-time basis through the August race at Kentucky Speedway, which is his last start in the series.

Indy Lights

References

External links
 Sitio Oficial Pablo Donoso

1984 births
Chilean racing drivers
Indy Lights drivers
Living people
Indy Pro 2000 Championship drivers
Sportspeople from Santiago
Formula Renault Argentina drivers
USAC Silver Crown Series drivers
Team Moore Racing drivers
A. J. Foyt Enterprises drivers
Rahal Letterman Lanigan Racing drivers